Hossein Fadaei is an Iranian conservative politician and former member of the Parliament of Iran representing Tehran, Rey, Shemiranat and Eslamshahr. He is Secretary General of the Society of Devotees of the Islamic Revolution and one of main figures of the Alliance of Builders of Islamic Iran.

Electoral history

References

1955 births
Living people
Members of the 7th Islamic Consultative Assembly
Members of the 8th Islamic Consultative Assembly
Deputies of Tehran, Rey, Shemiranat and Eslamshahr
Alliance of Builders of Islamic Iran politicians
Society of Devotees of the Islamic Revolution politicians
Mojahedin of the Islamic Revolution Organization politicians
Popular Front of Islamic Revolution Forces politicians
Secretaries-General of political parties in Iran
Islamic Revolutionary Guard Corps personnel of the Iran–Iraq War
Iranian campaign managers